Trip City is a novel set in the underground world of London nightclubs and concerns a fictional designer drug called FX. It was written by Trevor Miller and published in 1989 by Avernus Creative Media—a book imprint founded by science fiction author Brian Aldiss. The novel was packaged with a soundtrack cassette tape of original music by A Guy Called Gerald. Trip City is being reissued in June 2021 along with the soundtrack on vinyl for the first time.

Plot summary
Tom Valentine wakes up in an unfamiliar loft apartment - not sure where he is or how he got there. Despite the chic surroundings, there’s blood on his shirt, evidence of a struggle and a Luger  pistol on the Persian rug... Valentine is only certain of three things: The girl that he loved has been murdered. His mind has been warped by the effects of a powerful psychotropic drug and he only has one chance to bring the shrouded, corporate killers to justice...

References

1989 British novels
Novels set in London